Shabnam Behesht (born 30 December 1998) is an Iranian footballer who plays as a forward for Kowsar Women Football League club Shahrdari Sirjan. She has been a member of the Iran women's national team.

International goals

References 

1998 births
Living people
People from Kohgiluyeh and Boyer-Ahmad Province
Iranian women's footballers
Women's association football forwards
Iran women's international footballers
21st-century Iranian women